Willem Jacobus "Willie" Welgemoed (30 September 1925 – 11 July 1992) was a South African diver. He competed in the men's 3 metre springboard event at the 1952 Summer Olympics.

References

External links
 

1925 births
1992 deaths
South African male divers
Olympic divers of South Africa
Divers at the 1952 Summer Olympics
Sportspeople from Bloemfontein